Elgg may refer to:

Elgg, a municipality in the district of Winterthur in the canton of Zürich in Switzerland
Elgg railway station
Elgg Castle
 Elgg (software), an open source social networking platform

See also
Eigg (disambiguation)